The Arms Act may refer to the following:

 The Arms Act, 1959 in India
 The Arms Act (New Zealand), 1983 in New Zealand
 The Protection of Lawful Commerce in Arms Act, 2005 in the United States

See also
Firearms Act